Castlemaine XXXX's mascot is Mr Fourex - a jovial cartoon man in a suit with a boater hat, who features on the City side of the Fourex Brewery at Milton and is to be re-introduced into advertising in the near future for the first time since 1967.

The true identity for the inspiration behind the cartoon remains a mystery.
Mr Fourex is sometimes said to be modelled after Paddy Fitzgerald, a former director of the company, however Mr Fourex had been conceived in 1924, and Fitzgerald started with XXXX only in circa 1933. A second theory is that the cartoon is modelled on a well-known dwarf who sold newspapers in the inner city suburb of Fortitude Valley in the late 1920s.

See also

 List of Australian and New Zealand advertising characters

References

Australian mascots
Male characters in advertising
Mascots introduced in 1967
Corporate mascots
Drink advertising characters
Beer advertising
Fictional people from Queensland